The Department of Human Resources is an executive department of the government of New Brunswick.  It was created in 2001 from the management board division of the Department of Finance as the Office of Human Resources.  Its mandate is to manage the internal human resources of the provincial civil service. It was merged back with management board with both becoming a part of the Executive Council Office in 2011, however it reverted to a standalone agency in October 2012 now styled as the Department, rather than Office, of Human Resources.

Ministers
When the post was created it was styled minister responsible for the office of human resources and was held in addition to another portfolio.  From 2003 onward it has been styled minister of human resources, though from October 2010 to October 2012, it was again been held in addition to a more senior portfolio.

References

External links
Department of Human Resources

Human Resources